Adrian Fein (born 18 March 1999) is a German professional footballer who plays as a midfielder for Eredivisie club Excelsior. He has represented Germany internationally at various youth levels.

Club career 
Fein began playing football at the age of four at SV Helios Daglfing, a club based in his hometown Munich. He also had a spell at TSV 1860 Munich, before joining the Bayern Munich youth setup in 2006. In 2017, he was assigned to the reserves squad, making 27 appearances and scoring once in the 2017–18 Regionalliga season. 

On 1 September 2018, Fein joined 2. Bundesliga side SSV Jahn Regensburg on a season-long loan. He debuted on 23 September, in a 5–0 away win over Hamburger SV. He ended the season with a total of 21 appearances. 

On 18 June 2019, Fein signed for Hamburger SV, once again on loan for one season. On 26 October, he scored the last goal in a 6–2 win over VfB Stuttgart.

Fein returned to Bayern Munich ahead of the 2020–21 season as a first team squad member. On 6 October 2020, Bayern reached an agreement with PSV Eindhoven for the season-long loan of Fein, with an option to buy.

On 14 July 2021, he joined Greuther Fürth on loan.

On 24 August 2022, Fein signed a two-year contract with recently promoted Eredivisie club Excelsior on a free transfer.

International career 
Fein has been capped by Germany at U18, U19, U20 and U21 levels.

Career statistics

Honours
Bayern Munich
 DFL-Supercup: 2020
 UEFA Super Cup: 2020

References

External links

1999 births
Living people
Footballers from Munich
German footballers
Germany youth international footballers
Association football midfielders
Germany under-21 international footballers
FC Bayern Munich footballers
FC Bayern Munich II players
SSV Jahn Regensburg players
Hamburger SV players
PSV Eindhoven players
SpVgg Greuther Fürth players
Dynamo Dresden players
Excelsior Rotterdam players
Bundesliga players
2. Bundesliga players
3. Liga players
Regionalliga players
Eredivisie players
German expatriate footballers
German expatriate sportspeople in the Netherlands
Expatriate footballers in the Netherlands